Ben Kelsey may refer to:

Benjamin Kelsey (1813–1889), California pioneer
Benjamin S. Kelsey (1906–1981), U.S. Air Corps fighter projects officer
Ben Kelsey (strongman) (born 1984), English strength athlete